The 2022–23 Lake Superior State Lakers men's ice hockey season was the 57th season of play for the program, the 50th at the Division I level and the 43rd in the CCHA conference. The Lakers represented Lake Superior State University and were coached by Damon Whitten, in his 9th season.

Season
With the vast majority of the team returning, there was little reason to thin that Lake Superior wouldn't be able to have at least as good a season as they had in 2022. However, from the drop of the puck, nothing seemed to go right for the Lakers. Early on, neither Ethan Langenegger nor Seth Eisele were able to keep the puck out of the goal; Laker Superior averaged nearly 4 goals against per game through their first 8 games. Worse, the offense had dried up. Across the board, players were having a much tougher time getting the puck into the opposing goal. The Lakers scored 36 fewer goals than they had the year before, a full goal less per game. With one of the worse offenses in the nation, the team plummeted to the bottom of the CCHA standings and remained their all season. Lake Superior was at or near the bottom of the national rankings as well, and the team was on pace to post the worst season in program history.

Near the end of January, the defense began to come around. Over their final 7 matches, the Lakers allowed just 2 goals against per game. The offense also saw a modest increase and saw the Lakers go 5–2 in those contests. While they were unable to do anything about their playoff position, the increased level of play did allow the team to avoid posting a historically bad season.

Lake Superior's opponent for the quarterfinals was Minnesota State. While there was some hope that the improved play would carry over into the postseason, the Mavericks made quick work of the Lakers in the first game. While the final score was better in the rematch, MSU controlled the game, outshooting LSSU 18–40 and end a very disappointing season for the Lakers.

Departures

Recruiting

Roster
As of July 30, 2022.

Standings

Schedule and results

|-
!colspan=12 style=";" | Exhibition

|-
!colspan=12 style=";" | Regular Season

|-
!colspan=12 style=";" | 

|-
!colspan=12 style=";" |

Scoring statistics

Goaltending statistics

Rankings

Note: USCHO did not release a poll in weeks 1, 13, or 26.

References

2022-23
Lake Superior State Lakers
Lake Superior State Lakers
Lake Superior State Lakers
Lake Superior State Lakers